The 1997–98 season was Manchester City's second in the First Division following relegation from the Premier League in 1995–96. The 1996–97 season had been a turbulent one; Five different managers took charge of the team over the course of the season (three permanent appointments and two caretakers), including Steve Coppell, who resigned after just 32 days as manager. Frank Clark became manager in December 1996 and was in charge for the start of the 1997–98 season.

Despite speculation that linked him with a transfer, 1996–97 Player of the Season Georgi Kinkladze stayed at the club, and signed a three-year contract that made him the highest-paid player in Manchester City's history. The highest profile signing was striker Lee Bradbury, who joined from Portsmouth for a club record £3 million. Defender Tony Vaughan arrived from Ipswich Town. His transfer free was decided by tribunal and set at £1.35 million, more than double City's valuation. The club also signed Dutch midfielder Gerard Wiekens from BV Veendam for £500,000. Wiekens had agreed to join the club in March, but the move only took place once the previous season had finished. Departing was Peter Beagrie, sold to Bradford City for £200,000. In an early-season interview with the Sunday Times, Frank Clark bemoaned the difficulty of reducing the size of his squad, which contained 40 senior professionals: "This squad is too big, but a lot of the players are on good contracts which other clubs won't match. You can't blame them for staying." "We've got around 12 very good youngsters whose potential is really encouraging, but they can't get a reserve-team game. Because we've got to fill the reserves with senior pros needing match practice or players we're trying to sell, the youngsters' development is held up."

Joe Royle replaced Frank Clark in February 1998.

Off the field, the club introduced a new badge, and changed the colour of the home shirt to a much deeper shade termed "laser blue". The new kit was made by Kappa; this ended a 63-year association with Umbro.

In its preview of the forthcoming season, The Times listed bookmakers odds that put Manchester City as 6/1 joint second favourites to win the division.

Team kit

League
The league campaign started with a home match against Portsmouth. Bradbury, Vaughan and Wiekens all made their debuts. The match finished 2–2, with a debut goal for Wiekens. The first away match was a trip to Sunderland, a match that was the first competitive fixture at the Stadium of Light. City lost 3–1 to a team spearheaded by their former striker Niall Quinn. Jason van Blerk made his debut in the match, having signed on a free transfer in the run-up to the fixture. The first league win did not arrive until the fifth match, when Nottingham Forest were beaten at the City Ground. Three games later City's second win of the season was emphatic, 6–0 at home to Swindon Town.

Lee Bradbury cracked a vertebra at the start of October, and coupled with an injury to Uwe Rösler, City were left with few options in attack. The team scored just one goal in October. A succession of reserve strikers were tried; Barry Conlon, Chris Greenacre, Ray Kelly and Gerry Creaney all saw their first action of the season. The situation was exacerbated in late October when Kinkladze crashed his Ferrari, sustaining a back injury that required 30 stitches and caused him to miss two matches. By November City lay in the relegation zone with just 3 wins from 16 matches. A home defeat to Huddersfield Town led to open rebellion amongst the club's supporters. On the tenth anniversary of a match in which the same opposition were beaten 10–1, Manchester City succumbed to a defeat that was last-placed club Huddersfield's first away win of the season. Choruses of "You're not fit to wear the shirt" rang out during the match. Afterward two thousand supporters held a demonstration demanding the resignation of chairman Francis Lee. The season hit a new low with 3–1 away defeat to local rivals Stockport County who were having the best season in their history. The club picked up enough wins here and there to at least stay out of the relegation zone, but then a horrific run of form after Christmas saw the club dumped to the bottom of the table following a 2–1 loss to Ipswich Town in February. This proved the end of the road for Clark, who was sacked later that day and replaced by Joe Royle, who had been out of the game since resigning as Everton manager a year prior.

A run of three wins from Royle's first four matches seemed to get things back on track for City, but then the club's form slumped again, and most damagingly they lost virtually all of their matches against the other teams involved in the relegation struggle. Francis Lee finally resigned during this poor run-in, with David Bernstein replacing him as chairman, and a failure to beat Queens Park Rangers in their penultimate match effectively ended their survival hopes, leaving them needing to beat Stoke City while hoping that both Port Vale and Portsmouth failed to win their own final matches. In the end, while City were at least able to end the season on a high by beating Stoke, both Port Vale and Portsmouth won that day, sending City into the third tier for the first time in their history.

Table

Results summary

Matches

FA Cup
Manchester City entered the FA Cup in the third round, the starting point for all clubs in the top two divisions. Drawn at home to fellow First Division club Bradford City, Manchester City won 2–0. Another home tie followed in the fourth round, against Premier League club West Ham United. City trailed 1–0 at half time, but a solo goal from Georgi Kinkladze levelled the score. A penalty gave City the chance to take the lead, but Uwe Rösler's kick went high over the crossbar. Two minutes later, former City player Steve Lomas scored for West Ham. City lost 2–1 and exited the competition.

League Cup
Manchester City entered the League Cup in the first round for the first time. In previous years, the club's league position had been sufficient to gain a bye into the second round. Blackpool were the opposition in the first round, for which ties were played over two legs. In the first leg, at Bloomfield Road, City lost 1–0. The return leg was chosen for live television coverage. Kevin Horlock scored with two minutes of normal time remaining to make the score 1–1 on aggregate and take the tie to extra time. No goals were scored in extra time, so the result was decided by a penalty shootout. Horlock and Bradbury's kicks missed, and Blackpool won the shootout 4–2.

Squad
Appearances for competitive matches only, substitute appearances in brackets
Source:

Transfers

In

Out

References

Manchester City F.C. seasons
Manchester City